Giulio Rossi (Milan, 1824–1884) was an Italian painter and photographer.

Biography
A leading figure in the Cinque Giornate uprising of 1848 in Milan, Giulio Rossi devoted his energies to painting and photography, specialising as a photographic portraitist in the following decade. He is known to have had his first studio in Contrada dei Nobili (later renamed Via dell’Unione) in 1854 and to have moved from there to Via Bigli in 1866. He was awarded a silver medal at the Esposizione Industriale Italiana (Milan, Salone dei Giardini Pubblici, 1871). A talented experimenter with photographic techniques, he achieved success with portraits of the upper middle-class and aristocratic society of the time, expanding his business with two new shops on Corso Vittorio Emanuele and branches in Genoa and Trieste.

References
 Laura Casone, Giulio Rossi, online catalogue Artgate by Fondazione Cariplo, 2010, CC BY-SA (source for the first revision of this article).

Other projects

19th-century Italian painters
Italian male painters
Italian photographers
Italian vedutisti
1824 births
1884 deaths
19th-century Italian male artists